Her Jungle Love is a 1938 American south seas adventure film directed by George Archainbaud and starring Dorothy Lamour and Ray Milland. Portions of the film were shot at Palm Springs, California.

Plot
Two pilots (Ray Milland, Lynne Overman) on a rescue mission meet a white jungle girl (Dorothy Lamour) in the South Seas.

Cast
 Dorothy Lamour as Tura
 Ray Milland as Bob Mitchell
 Lynne Overman as Jimmy Wallace
 J. Carrol Naish as Kuasa
 Virginia Vale as Eleanor Martin (as Dorothy Howe)
 Jonathan Hale as J.C. Martin
 Archie Twitchell as Roy Atkins
 Jiggs (chimpanzee) as Gaga

References

External links
 
 
 

1938 films
1930s color films
1938 adventure films
American adventure films
Films directed by George Archainbaud
Films set in Oceania
Films shot in California
Jungle girls
Paramount Pictures films
1930s English-language films
1930s American films